Helena Blach Lavrsen (born June 7, 1963) is a Danish curler, several times skip for the Danish team, Olympic medalist and European champion. She received a silver medal at the 1998 Winter Olympics in Nagano. She has obtained four medals at the World Curling Championships, and is European champion from 1994.

References

External links

 

1963 births
Living people
Danish female curlers
Curlers at the 1992 Winter Olympics
Curlers at the 1998 Winter Olympics
Olympic silver medalists for Denmark
Olympic curlers of Denmark
Olympic medalists in curling
Medalists at the 1998 Winter Olympics
European curling champions
20th-century Danish women